Ather Farouqui is an Indian writer and political analyst. He is the General Secretary of Anjuman Taraqqi Urdu (Hind). Farouqui has been awarded the Sahitya Academy Award for his translations of Salman Khursheed's play ‘Sons of Babur’ in Urdu. He is also been conferred with the ‘Best Translator’ award in 2016 by Delhi Urdu Academy.

He was the former Secretary of the Zakir Hussain Study Circle.

Early Life and Education 
Dr. Ather Farouqui was born in 1964 in Sikandrabad, Uttar Pradesh.

He completed his M.A. from Chaudhary Charan Singh University in Urdu Literature and went to study at Jawahar Lal Nehru University first for a Part Time Diploma in Mass Communication followed by an MPhil and a PhD under Professor Imtiaz Ahmad on the socio - political condition of Urdu in India in the post partition era.

Books 
Dr. Ather Farouqui has authored several books in English Hindi and Urdu, his writings include:

English

 Redefining Urdu Politics in India (OUP 2006)

 Muslims and Media Images: News versus Views (OUP 2009)

 The Life and Poetry of Bahadur Shah Zafar (Translation of Aslam Parvez's book. Hay House 2017 (hardbound); paperback 2021)

 Delhi in Historical Perspectives (Translation of K.A. Nizami’s lectures on Delhi. OUP 2020)

 The Last Gathering (Translation of Munshi Faizuddiin's book Bazm-I-Aakhir. Roli Books, 2021)

Urdu

 Makhmoor Saeedi Ek Muta’la (Allama Iqbal Cultural Society. Sikandrabad, 1986)

 Rasheed Hasan Khan: Hyat aur Adabi Khidma’t (Maktaba Jamia, New Delhi 2002)

 Guftugoo Unki (Anjuman Taraqqi Urdu (Hind), 2006)

 Azad Hindustan Mein Urdu Zaban, Taleem aur Sahafat (Anjuman Taraqqi Urdu (Hind), 2007)

 Hindustaan Mein Urdu Siyasat ki Tafheem-i Nau (Anjuman Taraqqi Urdu (Hind), 2010)

 Na Mukammal (Urdu, 2010)

 Ghalib's Qaadirnama (Edited, NCPUL, 2011)

 Unneesveen Sadi Main Adab, Tareekh aur Tehzeeb (Anjuman Taraqqi Urdu (Hind), 2014)

 Armughan-I Faruqi (Festschrift in honour of S.R. Faruqi) (Anjuman Taraqqi Urdu (Hind), 2019)

 Akhtar ul-Iman (Anjuman Taraqqi Urdu (Hind) 2015)

 Babur Ki Aulad (Rupa &amp; Company, New Delhi. 2008)

Hindi

 Akhtar-ul Iman's Sarosaaman into Devanagri (transliteration from Urdu into Hindi, Saransh Prakashan. 1996)

 Babur Ki Aulad (Hindi Translation, Rupa & Company 2008)

Journals 
Dr. Ather Farouqui is the editor of the following journals:

Urdu

 Urdu Adab (quarterly journal published by Anjuman Taraqqui Urdu Hind)

 Hamari Zabaan. (weekly newspaper published by Anjuman Taraqqui Urdu Hind)

Reviews 
Dr. Ather Farouqui's review work includes:

 ‘On Urdu’, Review of ‘How Not to Write the History of Urdu Literature’ by Ralph Russell (EPW, Vol. 35, Issue No. 21/22, May 27, 2000).

 ‘Salvaging Urdu from Degradation' Review of 'The Oxford India Anthology of Modern Urdu Literature, Poetry and Prose Miscellaneous', edited by Mehr Afshan Farooqi (EPW, Vol. 43, Issue No. 18, May 3 2008).

 Review of ‘Liking Progress, Loving Change: Literary History of the Progressive Writers’ Movement’, by Rakshanda Jalil (Published by Sahitya Akademi. Vol. 58, No. 4 (282). July/August 2014).

 ‘Estranged Siblings: Urdu and Hindi’ Review of the book ‘From Hindi to Urdu: A Social and Political History’ by Tariq Rahman (Hyderabad: Orient Blackswan), 2011, Vol. 46, Issue No. 38, September 17, 2011).

Articles 
Dr. Ather Farouqui has contributed to Outlook, Times of India, Economic and Political Weekly, American Journal of Economics and Sociology, South Asia Journal of South Asian Studies, IIC Quarterly, Mainstream, The Milli Gazette among others. His articles include:

Articles

 ‘Future Prospects of Urdu in India’ (Mainstream, Annual issue 1992).

 ‘Urdu Education in India: Four Representative States’ (EPW, Vol. 29, No. 14 (April 2, 1994), pp.782-785).

 ‘The Emerging Dilemma of the Urdu Press in India’ (The American Journal of Economics and Sociology, New York, Volume 53, Issue No. 3, July 1,1994).

 ‘The Emerging Dilemma of the Urdu Press in India’ (South Asia Journal of South Asian Studies, Australia, Vol. 12, Issue No. 2, 1995).

 ‘Urdu Education in India’ (EPW, vol. 37, January 2002).

 ‘Urdu Language and Education - Need for Political Will and Strategy’ (EPW, vol. 37, Issue No. 25, June 22, 2002).

 With Hasan Abdullah ‘Facing the RSS Challenge’ (EPW, vol. 37, June 2002).

 ‘The Distortionists’ (Outlook, November 2, 2004).

 ‘Who's the Real Muslim?’ (Outlook, December 6, 2004).

 ‘Friends and Foes’ (TOI, April 18 2005).

 ‘The great Urdu fraud’, Part-I (The Milli Gazette, New Delhi, 1-15 May 2005)

 ‘The great Urdu fraud’, Part-II (The Milli Gazette, New Delhi, 16-31 May 2005)

 ‘The emerging dilemma of the Urdu press in India: A viewpoint’ (South Asia: Journal of South Asia Studies, Vol. 18, Issue 2, 1995), Published online (www.tandfonline.com, May 8, 2007).

 ‘Triple Talaq Isn't Islamic’ (TOI, July 16 2007).

 ‘Triple Talaq Isn't Islamic’ (www.defence.pk, July 16 2007).

 ‘Indian Muslim's Dilemma’ (TOI, December 31 2007).

 'The Gentle Zephyr’ (Outlook, April 28, 2008).

 ‘It's Daylight Robbery’ (TOI, July 28 2008).

 ‘Pariahs in Our Own Home’ (TOI, April 23 2009).

 ‘Riyadh Diary’ (Outlook Weekly, New Delhi, March 29, 2010).

 Dr Abdul Jalil Faridi: A Lost Chapter in the History of the Ruthless, Obscurantist Urdu Politics of North India by Ather Farouqui, translated by Yoginder Sikand for newageislam.com (November 23, 2010).

 ‘Syed Shahabuddin on his life and Politics’ exclusive interview by Dr Ather Farouqui (Newageislam.com, February 15, 2011).

 ‘Islamic Banking: An Anathema to Civil Society’ (EPW, Vol. 46, May 7, 2011).

 ‘Islamic Banking in India at the Service of Pan-Islamists’ (Mainstream, vol. 11, March 3, 2012)

 Urdu needs Kiss of Life and not Myopic Policies – Ather Farouqui (Mainstream, New Delhi Vol.No. 33, August 4, 2012)

 My Second Innings: “Battling” for Urdu with the Chief Minister of Delhi – Ather Farouqui (Mainstream, New Delhi Vol. No. 40, September 21, 2013)

 ‘It Is Majoritarianism That Needs To Be Contested’ – Ather Farouqui Interviews Ayesha Jalal (Outlookindia, June 24, 2014)

 ‘Inner History of a Lost Culture’ (IIC Quarterly, Volume 44, No. 1, Summer 2017)

 'Developing Linkage between the Muslim Mind and National Polity' – Syed Shahabuddin's Interview to Ather Farouqui (Mainstream, New Delhi Vol. No. 13, March 18, 2017).

 ‘In the Family Way’ (TOI 6, September 2017)

 ‘Inner History of a Lost Culture’ (IIC Quarterly, Vol. 44, No. 1, Summer 2017).

 ‘Delhi Diary’ (Mainstream, New Delhi Vol. No. 38, September 5, 2020).

 ‘Urdu’: Not a Language but the City of Shajahanabad (IIC Quarterly, Autumn 2020).

 The Denial of Prophecy and a Tryst with History: Salman Rushdie's Midnight's Children (IIC Quarterly, Summer 2021).
 'Playing English' -The Politics of Identity and Space in Vikram Seth's 'An Equal Music' (IIC Quarterly, Vol. 49, No.1, Summer 22)

References 

Year of birth missing (living people)
Living people
Sahitya Akademi Prize for Translation